Nizhnelachentau (Tübänge Ilısıntaw) is a rural locality (a selo) in Verkhnelachentausky Selsoviet, Birsky District, Bashkortostan, Russia. The population was 77 as of 2010. There are 3 streets.

Geography 
Nizhnelachentau is located 35 km northwest of Birsk (the district's administrative centre) by road. Verkhnelachentau is the nearest rural locality.

References 

Rural localities in Birsky District